George A. Thompson (1921–2000) was an American inventor and businessman who held many patents in the pumping industry and is credited with the invention of the rotary pump. His many inventions and pioneering spirit led to the creation of Thompson Pump & Manufacturing company.

History
George A. Thompson was born in 1921 in Drumwright, Oklahoma. Like many other industry pioneers, he grew up in poverty during the great depression. George Thompson was a self-taught civil and mechanical engineer with limited formal advanced education but with extensive U.S. Navy schooling. Mr. Thompson was a veteran of the U. S. Navy during World War II where he plied the North Atlantic Ocean.

Career

Beginnings

During his long and varied career, he worked for the Civilian Conservation Corps, for the Army Corps of Engineers; as a surveyor; and also for ITT/Federal Electric Corporation in support of the Apollo Project which produced the first manned lunar landing. He entered the construction equipment industry in 1946 in New York City where he realized that many of the products and techniques of pumping and dewatering were inefficient.

He moved from Long Island City, New York in 1951 to Daytona Beach, Florida. In 1970, he founded the Thompson Pump and Manufacturing Company in Port Orange, FL which has grown to international prominence under his direction. Mr. Thompson spent 1946 through 1965 and 1970 – 1999, totaling 48 years in the business. He remained active in the family’s business until a year before dying in May 2000.

A member of Who’s Who of American Inventors, Mr. Thompson was the holder of numerous patents and his engineering expertise, innovative designs and unique accomplishments in the fields of construction dewatering and manufacturing were widely recognized. A pioneer and trailblazer, he invented and patented many unique and innovative products and techniques which improved the construction equipment industry.

Contributions
Mr. Thompson introduced the Vacuum Well and Filtervac pipe to the industry. Though he did not formally patent these designs, he created them and used them in innovative ways. These types of underdrain pipes were able to draw vacuum without collapsing, which enabled them to attach to a pump to dewater a construction site.

His development of the first self-priming rotary pump revolutionized wellpoint dewatering methods. He has contributed greatly to his industry. In total, Mr. Thompson holds seven U.S. patents directly related to the construction equipment industry.

Creation of Thompson Pump & Manufacturing Company

Today, because of George A. Thompson, Thompson Pump and Manufacturing is known worldwide for its different lines of high quality pumps, ranging in size from 2 to 18 inches. Thompson Pump sells and rents their entire line of pumps to the areas of public works, municipalities, construction, agriculture, dewatering, mining, sewer/lift stations, and water/waste water. Types of pumps engineered include wet prime trash pumps; dry prime trash pumps with compressor-assisted or vacuum-assisted priming systems; sound attenuated pumps; utility trash pumps; diaphragm pumps; hydraulic power units with submersible pump ends; rotary, vacuum and piston wellpoint pumps and high pressure jet pumps. In addition, Thompson provides engineering services and special applications consulting for complicated wellpoint, bypass or multiple pump systems; and offers thorough pump and dewatering education and training through its Pumpology courses.

References

1921 births
2000 deaths
Civilian Conservation Corps people
20th-century American inventors
People from Long Island City, Queens
People from Daytona Beach, Florida
United States Navy personnel of World War II